The Israel Arnold House is an historic house on Great Road in Lincoln, Rhode Island.  It is a -story wood-frame structure, set on a hillside lot on the south side of Great Road.  The main block is five bays wide, with a central chimney rising through the gable roof.  A -story gambrel-roofed ell extends to one side.  The ell is the oldest portion of the house, built c. 1720 by someone named Olney.  The main block was built c. 1760.  The house was owned into the 20th century by four generations of individuals named Israel Arnold.

The house was listed on the National Register of Historic Places on December 18, 1970.

See also
Eleazer Arnold House
National Register of Historic Places listings in Providence County, Rhode Island

References

Houses completed in 1720
Houses on the National Register of Historic Places in Rhode Island
Houses in Lincoln, Rhode Island
National Register of Historic Places in Providence County, Rhode Island
Historic district contributing properties in Rhode Island
1720 establishments in the Thirteen Colonies